The Department of Taxes and Attorney General's Chambers Building (sometimes shortened to Attorney General's Chambers Building) is currently the tallest building in Botswana and one of the most expensive buildings built in Africa. The building, located in the Government Enclave on Nelson Mandela Drive in Gaborone, is home to the Botswana Department of Taxes and the Attorney General's Chambers.

History
Miscommunication and financial mismanagement caused construction of the building to grossly exceed both the deadline and budget. The part of the building originally for the Attorney General's Chambers was assigned to three other departments (i.e. the Ministry of Commerce and Industry; the Ministry of Works, Transport and Communications; and the Department of Architecture and Building Services) before being assigned to the Attorney General once again. Lesego Motsumi, Minister of Works and Transport, reported that "the project had a time delay of 544 days which resulted in an additional cost of P11,734,464.27" (US$1.9 million in July 2007).

Architecture
The building's design has been criticised for its glass windows, which can cause high energy costs in a hot climate.

Notes

Citations

References

External links
Botswana Department of Taxes
Attorney General's Chambers

Government of Botswana
Buildings and structures in Gaborone
Landmarks in Gaborone